Maïmouna Doucouré (born 1985) is a French filmmaker. She made her feature film directorial debut with Cuties in 2020 and became a controversial figure globally after the film's international release on Netflix. On 8 March 2019 coinciding with the International Women's Day, she received the Academy Gold Fellowship for Women from the Academy Women's Initiative.

Life and career
Doucouré was born and raised in Paris to parents of Senegalese origin. She grew up in a polygamous family with two mothers. Doucouré often visited her grandmother in Senegal as a child during vacations. 

When asked by an interviewer whether the arts run in her family, she said, "No. My father is a street sweeper, my mother works in a shop.” Her mother discouraged her when she initially shared her aspiration to be a filmmaker.

Doucouré graduated with a licence in biology from Pierre and Marie Curie University. 
She created and released her first self-made short film, Hide-and-seek, in 2013. She is married to Sylvain de Zangroniz, also known as Zangro, who is also the producer of most of her films.

Maman(s)

In 2015, she produced her second short film, Maman(s), with the assistance of studio Bien ou Bien Productions and producer Zangro. The short film was critically acclaimed for its screenplay and was premiered at the 2015 Toronto International Film Festival, 2016 Sundance Film Festival and also jointly won the César Award for Best Short Film at the 42nd César Awards in 2017 along with Towards Tenderness directed by Alice Diop. During the 2017 Cesar Award ceremony, she reflected her painful experiences of being a black, Muslim female director while working in a white male dominated film industry.

Cuties

She penned the script for her debut feature film Cuties in early 2017 taking her life experience as a refugee girl into account. The script eventually won the Sundance's Global Filmmaking Award in 2017. The film is based on a traditional Senegalese Muslim girl who is caught and torn between two contrasting fortunes, traditional values and internet culture while also speaking about hypersexualization of preadolescent girls. It premiered in the World Cinema Dramatic Competition sector of 2020 Sundance Film Festival on 23 January 2020 and won the Directing Jury Award praising the script of the film. The film was not deemed controversial when it was premiered at the Sundance Film Festival.

Doucouré said she "created a climate of trust between the children and myself" during filming. She stated while working on the film, "I explained to them everything I was doing and the research that I had done before I wrote this story. I was also lucky that these girls' parents were also activists, so we were all on the same side. At their age, they've seen this kind of dance. Any child with a telephone can find these images on social media these days." She also stated that she worked with a child psychologist during filming. It was revealed that Doucouré spent nearly 18 months researching studies how young and pre-teen children are being exposed to 18+ adult content and sexualised images on social media in order to showcase the accurate reality in the film. She revealed that approximately 700 girls were auditioned to choose the suitable girl to play the lead role.

Despite being critically acclaimed, the film became the subject of public controversy with the release of a promotional poster by Netflix. The social media outrage culminated in a petition claiming it "sexualizes an 11-year-old for the viewing pleasure of paedophiles" attracting 25,000 signatures in less than 24 hours. Doucouré was also targeted directly, receiving multiple death threats, even though the director and Netflix both stated that she had never seen the promotional poster in question, and that any promotion of child sexualization is neither intended nor an accurate representation of the movie. Netflix co-CEO Ted Sarandos apologised to Doucouré and the company removed the poster from the platform.

In September 2020, in an interview hosted by French organisation UniFrance, she reflected that the film became controversial primarily due to Netflix's selection of artwork. She insisted that she also shares the same spirit and fight against sexualisation of children similar to those who have been criticising the film.

Hawa
Her second feature film, Hawa, premiered in the Platform Prize lineup at the 2022 Toronto International Film Festival.

Untitled Josephine Baker film
In December 2022, Variety announced that Doucouré was working on a film about Josephine Baker, with Studiocanal producing the film.

References

External links 
 

1985 births
21st-century French women writers
Film directors from Paris
French people of Senegalese descent
French women film directors
French women screenwriters
Living people
Pierre and Marie Curie University alumni
Writers from Paris
Sundance Film Festival award winners